The Ducal Georgianum is a theological seminary of the Ludwig Maximilian University of Munich in Germany. It was founded in 1494. Pope Benedict XVI studied at the Seminary until 1951.

External links
  
http://www.roehrner.de/georgianum 

Education in Munich
Ludwig Maximilian University of Munich
1490s establishments in the Holy Roman Empire
1494 establishments in Europe
Seminaries and theological colleges in Germany